Culullitheca was a genus of land plant with branching axes. It is known from charcoalified Early Devonian deposits, its type locality being the Brown Clee Hill lagerstätten. Its spores formed permanent dyads.

References 

Silurian plants
Devonian plants
Prehistoric plant genera